RW Kit Cars Ltd. was an English manufacturer of kit cars, founded in 1983 by Roger Woolley.

Vehicles

RW Karma

In 1984 RW Kit Cars took over Perry Automotive Development's Karma project. Perry had been manufacturing the Karma, which was designed by Custom Classics of California, since 1982.  It is a fibreglass copy of the Ferrari Dino 246 GT, built around the floor pan of a Volkswagen Beetle, a popular choice of donor vehicle at the time. RW continued to sell the VW-based car, but also added a new backbone chassis that allowed the engine to be mid-mounted and Ford components to be used as an alternative to the VW option.

RW Chopper

The Chopper is a tricycle powered by a VW Beetle engine. It was produced from 1983 until 1984, during which time about five were made.

RW Taurus

The Taurus is a Lamborghini Countach replica based on the VW Beetle. It was manufactured from 1984 until 1985, during which time about 32 were produced, most of them exported to Germany.

RW 427

The 427 is a replica of the AC Cobra, manufactured from 1988 until 1990. About 28 were built, 18 of them with a front engine and rear-wheel drive configuration, and 10 for export to France based on the VW floor pan.

References

Citations

Bibliography

Kit car manufacturers